Grandma Threading her Needle is a 1900 British short  silent comedy film, directed by George Albert Smith, featuring a grandma trying to get a thread though a needle. The sole purpose of the single-shot film, like the director's  earlier Old Man Drinking a Glass of Beer (1898), according to Michael Brooke of BFI Screenonline, "is to record changing facial expressions for the purposes of entertainment."

References

External links

 Grandma Threading her Needle on screenonline.org.uk

1900 films
1900s British films
British black-and-white films
British silent short films
1900 comedy films
1900 short films
Films directed by George Albert Smith
British comedy short films
Silent comedy films